Pedro de Portocarrero may refer to the following people:

Pedro Portocarrero (bishop), a bishop in Spain in the late 16th century
Pedro de Portocarrero (conquistador), a conquistador active in Guatemala and Mexico